The information regarding List of rivers in the O'Higgins Region on this page has been compiled from the data supplied by GeoNames. It includes all features named "Rio", "Canal", "Arroyo", "Estero" and those Feature Code is associated with a stream of water. This list contains 156 water streams.

Content
This list contains:
 Name of the stream, in Spanish Language
 Coordinates are latitude and longitude of the feature in ± decimal degrees, at the mouth of the stream
 Link to a map including the Geonameid (a number which uniquely identifies a Geoname feature)
 Feature Code explained in 
 Other names for the same feature, if any
 Basin countries additional to Chile, if any

List

 Rio RapelRío Rapel3873714STM
  Estero de AlhueEstero de Alhué3900111STM
  Estero CarenEstero Carén3896674STM(Estero Caren, Estero Carén)
  Rio CachapoalRío Cachapoal3897523STM(Rio Cachapoal, Río Cachapoal)
  Estero Zamorano3867577STM(Estero Zamorano)
  Rio ClaroRío Claro (de Rengo)3894572STM
  Estero de Las Cadenas3884567STM(Esteno de La Cadena, Estero Cadena, Estero Cadenas, Estero de Las Cadenas)
  Rio CoyaRío Coya3893334STM(Arroyo Coya, Estero Coya, Rio Coya, Río Coya)
  Rio PangalRío Pangal3877389STM
  Rio Los CipresesRío Los Cipreses3882194STM(Rio Cipreses, Rio Los Cipreses, Río Cipreses, Río Los Cipreses)
  Rio TinguiriricaRío Tinguiririca3869789STM
  Estero Chimbarongo3895059STM(Estero Chimbarongo, Rio de Chimbarongo, Río de Chimbarongo)
  Rio ClaroRío Claro (Tinguiririca)3894571STM
 Estero de Nilahue3878649STM
 Estero Las Palmas3884083STM(Estero Las Palmas, Estero de las Palmas)
 Estero de La PoblacionEstero de La Población3884956STM

  Estero Navidad3878975STMI
  Rio San FranciscoRío San Francisco3872209STM
  Estero de Matanzas3880350STM(Estero Matanza, Estero de Matanzas)
  Estero TroncoEstero Troncó3869049STM
  Estero de Codegua3894462STM
  Estero PicarquinEstero Picarquín3876332STM(Cajon de Picarquin, Cajón de Picarquín, Estero Picarquin, Estero Picarquín)
  Estero de las Viedmas3868265STM
  Estero Seco3871060STM
  Estero Las Arenas3884628STM
  Estero de la Poza Honda3875243STM
  Estero del Teniente3869987STM
  Estero de Salto del Agua3872498STM
  Estero PulinEstero Pulín3874884STM
  Estero Manantiales3880757STM
  Estero Manquehue3880680STM
  Estero Los Lingues3881946STM(Estero Lingues, Estero Los Lingues)
  Estero MachaliEstero Machalí3881100STM(Arroyo Machali, Estero Machali, Estero Machalí)
  Estero de las Delicias3892673STM
  Estero del Valle3868663STMI
  Estero Los Quillayes3881457STM
  Estero Topocalma3869624STM
  Estero del Cuzco3892782STM
  Estero San Francisco3872217STM
  Estero del Agua Buena3900572STM
  Estero El Manzano3891077STM
  Quebrada Culenar3893058STM(Estero del Culenar, Quebrada Culenar, Quebrada Culenes)
  Agua del Estero3900526STM
  Estero de Quilicura3874207STM
  Estero Cartagena3896429STM(Estero Carjena, Estero Cartagena, Estero Cartajena)
  Estero El CajonEstero El Cajón3891800STM
  Estero El CoguilEstero El Cóguil3891580STM
  Estero Seco3871059STM
  Estero del Maule3880308STM
  Canal de las Acacias3900719DTCH
  Arroyo Laguna3885795STM(Arroyo Laguna, Estero Cauquenes, Estero Laguna)
  Arroyo Flores3889437STM(Arroyo Flores, Estero Flores)
  Estero de Clonqui3894541STM(Estero de Clonqui, Quebrada Conqui)
  Rio ParedonesRío Paredones3877181STM
  Estero Las Damas3884396STM(Estero Las Damas, Estero de las Damas)
  Estero MamaEstero Mamá3880782STM(Arroyo Mama, Estero Mama, Estero Mamá)
  Estero El Ganso3891327STM(Estero El Ganso, Estero del Ganso)
  Estero Las Garzas3884352STM
  Rio BlancoRío Blanco3898213STM
  Canal del Parral3877145DTCH
  Estero Alonso de Morales3900022STM
  Estero Mallermo3880835STM(Estero Mallermo, Estero Miguel Chico)
  Estero PurenEstero Purén3874611STM
  Canal de CocalanCanal de Cocalán3894508DTCH
  Estero Pailimo3877748STMX
  Estero Cachantun3897528STM
  Estero Poza del Toro3875244STM
  Estero Palmilla3877594STM
  Estero San Miguel3871895STM
  Estero de Las Cadenas3884566STM(Estero Cadenas, Estero de Las Cadenas)
  Estero de Los Valles3881295STM
  Canal de Quilicura3874209DTCH
  Canal Las Cabras3884579DTCH
  Estero Grande3888816STM
  Estero Chillehue3895076STM
  Estero de Idahue3887377STM
  Estero Pichiguao3876270STM
  Rio de Las LenasRío de Las Leñas3884242STM(Rio de Las Lenas, Rio de las Lenas, Río de Las Leñas, Río de las Leñas)
  Rio CortaderalRío Cortaderal3893421STM(Rio Cortaderal, Rio de las Cortaderas, Río Cortaderal, Río de las Cortaderas)
  Estero La Rosa3884701STM(Estero La Rosa, Estero La Rosas)
  Estero del Sauce3871200STM
  Estero Tipaume3869780STM
  Estero de Calleuque3897237STM(Estero Guirivilco, Estero Gurivllo, Estero de Calleuque, Guiribilo)
  Estero ChequenEstero Chequén3895242STM
  Estero de Trinidad3869079STMI
  Estero Yerbas Buenas3867662STM
  Canal de Almahue3900060DTCH
  Canal El Durazno3891454DTCH
  Estero Peralillo3876550STM
  Canal de Los Palquiales3881641DTCH
  Estero del PenonEstero del Peñón3876621STM
  Estero Carrizal3896497STM
  Estero del Monte3879480STMI
  Estero La Condenada3886206STM
  Estero de Lihueimo3883242STM
  Estero de La AranaEstero de La Araña3886551STM
  Canal ErrazurizCanal Errázuriz3889995DTCH
  Canal Chuchue3894787DTCH
  Estero de los Cipreses3894614STM(Arroyo de los Cipreses, Estero de los Cipreses)
  Estero Seco3871058STM
  Estero Huinica3887492STM
  Estero Antivero3899540STM(Arroyo Antivero, Estero Antivero)
  Canal del Huique3887488DTCH
  Estero de Cuenca3893148STM(Estero de Cuenca, Quebrada Cuenca)
  Estero Maquis3880566STM(Arroyo Los Maquis, Arroyo Maquis, Estero Maquis)
  Estero Maravillas3880550STM
  Estero del CharquicanEstero del Charquicán3895371STM
  Estero Rama3873827STM
  Estero Colhue3894286STM
  Estero El Quillay3890612STM
  Estero Colorado3894054STM(Arroyo Colorado, Estero Colorado)
  Estero de Las Toscas3883847STM(Estero de Las Toscas, Rio Las Toscas, Río Las Toscas)
  Estero La VinaEstero La Viña3883524STM
  Estero El Calvario3891786STM(Estero El Calvario, Quebrada Calbario)
  Estero de las Cardas3896729STM
  Quebrada de Llope3882839STMI(Estero Llope, Quebrada de Llope)
  Estero Paredones3877184STM
  Estero de Los Laureles3881963STM
  Estero Pumanque3874842STM
  Estero Membrillo3880071STM
  Canal PoblacionCanal Población3875600DTCH
  Canal Velazquino3868515DTCH
  Canal San Miguel3871899DTCH
  Canal San Juan3872028DTCH
  Canal Ruiz3872709DTCH
  Rio ClaroRío Claro3894570STM
  Estero de Las Toscas3883846STM
  Estero de Los Cardos3882259STM(Estero de Los Cardos, Estero de los Cardos)
  Estero de PanamaEstero de Panamá3877454STM
  Estero Truncalemu3869004STM
  Estero PudimavidaEstero Pudimávida3875057STM
  Estero Lolol3882650STM(Arroyo Lolol, Estero Lolol)
  Estero Nerquihue3878733STM(Estero Nerquihue, Estero de Norquihue, Quebrada Nerquihue)
  Estero Las Ovejas3884110STM(Estero Las Ovejas, Estero las Ovejas)
  Estero La Fortaleza3885930STM(Estero Fortaleza, Estero La Fortaleza)
  Estero Lima3883215STM
  Estero del Zapal3867561STM
  Estero San Pedro de AlcantaraEstero San Pedro de Alcántara3871782STM(Estero San Pedro de Alcantara, Estero San Pedro de Alcántara, Estero de Alcantara, Estero de Alcántara)
  Estero San Antonio3872378STM
  Estero de Quiahue3874305STM
  Estero Los Canales El Molino3882296STM
  Rio San AndresRío San Andrés3872425STM
  Estero de La Candelaria3886365STMI(Arroyo de La Candelaria, Estero de La Candelaria, Estero de la Candelaria)
  Estero de Las Garzas3884349STMI(Estero de Las Garzas, Quebrada de Las Garza)
  Estero Quintana3873994STM(Estero Carrizal, Estero Quintana)
  Canal La Platina3884971DTCH
  Estero El Buitre3891811STM(Estero Buitre, Estero El Buitre)
  Rio PortilloRío Portillo3875375STM
  Estero Helado3888128STM(Arroyo Helado, Estero Helado)
  Rio del AzufreRío del Azufre3899049STM
  Estero El Piral3890687STM
  Estero Fray Carlos3889328STM(Arroyo Fray Carlos, Estero Fray Carlos)
  Estero La PenuelaEstero La Peñuela3885038STM
  Estero Las Palmas3884082STM(Estero Las Palmas, Estero Palmas)
  Estero San RamonEstero San Ramón3871732STM
  Rio PalaciosRío Palacios3877657STM
  Rio de las DamasRío de las Damas3892748STM(Rio de Las Damas, Rio de las Damas, Río de Las Damas, Río de las Damas)

See also
 List of lakes in Chile
 List of volcanoes in Chile
 List of islands of Chile
 List of fjords, channels, sounds and straits of Chile
 List of lighthouses in Chile

Notes

References

External links
 Rivers of Chile
 Base de Datos Hidrográfica de Chile
 

O'Higgins